The Houston Sports Hall of Fame is a Hall of Fame that honors sports figures from or associated with the Houston area that have made a significant impact in their sport. It is located in Downtown Houston  at GreenStreet. The inductees can come from major professional sports teams as well as college or high school teams in Greater Houston. If the sport is a non-team sport, such as boxing and golf, they may get inducted by growing up in the area.

Inductees

References

External links
Houston Sports Awards - Hall of Fame

All-sports halls of fame
Biographical museums in Texas
Downtown Houston
Halls of fame in Texas
Sports in Houston
Sports museums in Texas
Houston Astros
Houston Rockets
Houston Texans